, also known as , is one of the leading characters in the ningyō jōruri and kabuki play Hiko-san Gongen chikai no sukedachi (彦山権現誓助劔) and in some other plays. The farmer turned samurai is known for his filial piety and incredible strength, and is viewed as an ideal samurai.

Plot 
Written by Tsugano Kafū and Chikamtsu Yasuzō, the Hiko-san Gongen chikai no sukedachi was first performed as a ningyō jōruri play in 1786. It gained popularity and was adopted as a kabuki play in the next year. It was set in the Azuchi-Momoyama period, when Toyotomi Hideyoshi was about to reunify Japan:

Yoshioka Ichimisai, a sword instructor to the Kōri (Mōri) clan, is killed with a sneak attack by Kyōgoku Takumi. His widow Okō and daughters Osono and Okiku swear revenge on him. However, Okiku is killed by Kyōgoku Takumi and her young son Yasamatsu disappears.

Around the same time, Rokusuke goes into mourning for his late mother in a mountainous village named Keya (Keya-mura). He lives a quiet life in the countryside as a farmer although he is a skilled swordmaster. In fact he was a student of Yoshioka Ichimisai. His skill is so famous that the local ruler has proclaimed that anyone who defeats Rokusuke would be hired as a sword instructor. Rokusuke is visited by a rōnin who styles himself Mijin Danjō but is Kyōgoku Takumi in disguise. Holding an elderly woman on his back to raise sympathy, Mijin Danjō asks Rokusuke to help him become a swordmaster. Rokusuke accepts his request and deliberately loses a match.

On his return, Rokusuke finds Yasamatsu without knowing that he is the grandson of his late teacher. He hangs the boy's kimono outside his house hoping that his family will see it. He is visited by an elderly woman, and then by a woman disguised as a traveling priest. She sees the kimono and misidentifies Rokusuke as the enemy. He fends off her fierce attack, and then Yasamatsu identifies her as his aunt Osono. She suddenly becomes very feminine and claims to be his wife, which is a highlight of the play. Then the elderly woman reveals her identify as the swordmaster's widow. Later he is visited by a woodman who asks for a revenge for the killing of his mother. It turns out that the woman brought by Mijin Danjō was the woodman's mother, not Mijin Danjō's. Osono identifies Mijin Danjō as Kyōgoku Takumi, and Rokusuke decides to help their revenge.

Rokusuke is refused to make a match against Mijin Danjō because of his humble state. He becomes a retainer of Katō Kiyomasa after demonstrating his incredible power and skills by a series of sumō matches. He is given the name of Kida Magobee (貴田孫兵衛). Now as a samurai, he challenges Mijin Danjō to a match and successfully defeats him. The play ends with Katō Kiyomasa's departure to the Korean campaign.

Model 
It is not clear how well this fiction reflects historical facts. A small village community named Keyamura is located in Tsukinoki, Yamakuni-machi, Nakatsu, Ōita Prefecture. There is a tomb of Kida Magobee (木田孫兵衛), which was built in the Meiji period. There is also an apparently old manuscript about Keyamura Rokusuke that contains the dates of copy of 1716 and 1902. According to the manuscript, Rokusuke was a son of a rōnin and his local wife. He joined Toyotomi Hideyoshi's Korean campaigns and distinguished himself as the unrivaled warrior. He returned to the village and died at the age of 62.

Kida Magobee himself was a real figure. He appeared as a retainer of Katō Kiyomasa in some contemporary sources. The Kiyomasa-ki, a not-so-faithful biography of Katō Kiyomasa written in the mid-17th century, claimed that Kida Magobee was killed in a battle with the Jurchens (Orankai) on the Manchurian border (in 1592). Japanologist Choi Gwan dismissed this claim. His name can be found in a letter written by Katō Kiyomasa about two months after his supposed death. One of the recipients was Kida Magobee himself. Until the end of the Edo period, the Kida family served to the Hosokawa clan, who replaced the Katō clan as the ruler of Kumamoto.

New myth in South Korea 
In South Korea, Keyamura Rokusuke is known as the target of a successful suicide attack by a kisaeng (official prostitute) named Nongae. However, the identification of the victim as Keyamura Rokusuke can only be traced back to the mid-20th century.

The new myth is as follows:

There is no contemporary record of Nongae. Relatively early accounts did not name the victim of her suicide attack. Later, various manuscripts of the Imjillok, a semi-fictitious history book, identify him as Katō Kiyomasa or Toyotomi Hideyoshi, which is obviously wrong. No contemporary Korean sources suggest that the Koreans recognized the name of Kida Magobee or Keyamura Rokusuke, not to mention his association with the suicide attack.

Choi Gwan claimed that Bak Jonghwa (朴鍾和)'s Nongae and Gyewolhyang (1962) was the first to identify the victim as Keyamura Rokusuke. Kawamura Minato discovered a slightly earlier mention of the new myth: a Japanese novel named Keijō, Chinkai and Fuzan (1951) by Tamagawa Ichirō.

Notes 

Fictional Japanese people
Male characters in literature
Samurai